The Civic Theatre is a 1,200-seat theater located in New Orleans, Louisiana. The theatre was originally built in 1906 and is used for concerts, plays, films, corporate events and private parties.

History 
The theater opened in 1906 as the Shubert Theatre and is the oldest performance theater in the city. It was built by the Shubert Brothers who were credited with establishing New York’s Broadway theater district. The theater was their first venue outside of New York and was used for plays, vaudeville, concerts, burlesque and film. During its history, Director Cecil B. Demille put on a production and performers such as Mae West performed at the theater. The venue changed names through the years and was also known as the Star, the Lafayette, the Poché and the Civic. It closed in the early 1990s. 

In the early 2000s, real estate developer Brian Gibbs purchased the property and in 2011, Gibbs along with real estate developer Bryan Bailey developed a plan to put the theater back into use. After a $10 million renovation, the Civic reopened for performances in September 2013. It was rebuilt with an adaptable modular flooring system that can be raised or lowered.

See also
List of music venues
Theatre in Louisiana

References

External links

Official website

Music venues in Louisiana
Performing arts centers in Louisiana
Theatres in New Orleans